, there were about 27,000 battery electric vehicles and 84,000 plug-in hybrid vehicles in Finland. , 31% of new cars sold in Finland were electric.

Statistics
, the Volkswagen ID.4 was the best-selling electric vehicle in Finland.

Government policy
, the Finnish government offers tax rebates of up to €2,000 for electric vehicle purchases.

Charging stations
, there were 1,302 public charging station locations in Finland.

Public opinion
In a 2022 poll conducted by Tori Auto, slightly more than half of respondents in Finland said that they were unwilling to buy an electric car for their next vehicle purchase, compared with 30% for Norway and Sweden, and 23% for Denmark.

By region

Central Finland
, 18% of new cars registered in Central Finland were electric.

North Ostrobothnia
, there were about 900 electric vehicles in Oulu.

Pirkanmaa
, there were about 1,500 electric vehicles in Tampere.

Satakunta
, about 11% of new cars registered in Satakunta were electric.

Southwest Finland
, there were about 1,000 electric vehicles in Turku.

Uusimaa
, there were about 6,000 electric vehicles in Helsinki.

Åland
, there were 16 public charging stations in Åland.

References

Finland
Road transport in Finland